Miroslav Vitouš Group is an album by Czech bassist Miroslav Vitouš recorded in 1980 and released on the ECM label.

Reception 
The All About Jazz review by John Kelman gives the album 5 stars, "Miroslav Vitous Group is unequivocally a jazz record, but one whose multifarious stylistic touchstones also makes it a long overdue release that is, indeed, informed by all kinds of music. And it's good, too—exceptionally good, in fact."

A review in the less specialist Allmusic site by Eugene Chadbourne awarded the album 2½ stars stating "This is an album that flutters between different jazz camps in a manner that might seem indecisive, and probably really is. It is hard to imagine exactly what sort of listener would really be pleased by the results, but also just as hard to deny the existence of excellent playing here and there".

Track listing 
All compositions by Miroslav Vitouš except as indicated
 "When Face Gets Pale" - 5:46 
 "Second Meeting" (Jon Christensen, Kenny Kirkland, John Surman, Vitouš) - 4:52 
 "Number Six" (Surman) - 5:50 
 "Inner Peace" (Kirkland) - 7:21 
 "Interplay" (Christensen, Kirkland, Surman, Vitouš) - 9:56 
 "Gears" - 6:29 
 "Sleeping Beauty" (Christensen, Kirkland, Surman, Vitouš) - 4:59 
 "Eagle" - 1:54
Recorded at Talent Studio in Oslo, Norway in July 1980

Personnel 
 Miroslav Vitouš — double bass
 John Surman — soprano saxophone
 Kenny Kirkland — piano 
 Jon Christensen — drums

References 

ECM Records albums
Miroslav Vitouš albums
1981 albums
Albums produced by Manfred Eicher